Olio may refer to:

Arts and entertainment 
Olio (musical number), a short dance or song performed as an encore to a theatrical play
 Olio drop, a kind of theater curtain
Olio (Mina album), 1999
Olio (Thad Jones album), album released in 1957
The Olio, a book of essays, poetry and other short pieces by Francis Grose, first published in 1792
Olio (book), a book of poetry written by Tyehimba Jess that was released in 2016
"Olio", a song by the Rapture on their albums Echoes and Mirror
Aglio e Olio, an EP by the Beastie Boys, released in 1995

Food 
Olio (app), a food-sharing service
 Olio is an English name for the Spanish stew also known as Olla podrida
Aglio e olio, an Italian pasta dish
olio, meaning oil in Italian and also an old term for an English oil-based dressing for food

Places 
Olio Township, Woodford County, Illinois, USA
Ponte dell'Olio, a comune (municipality) in the Province of Piacenza in the Italian region Emilia-Romagna

Other uses 
Olio Model One, a smartwatch produced from 2015-2016 by now defunct Olio Devices, Inc.
Nancy Dell'Olio (or Annunziata Dell'Olio), Italian property lawyer who attained fame as the girlfriend of former England national football team coach Sven-Göran Eriksson

See also 
Oleo (disambiguation)